Kirill Aleksandrovich Muzyka (born 22 November 1990) is a former Russian professional football player.

Club career
He made his professional debut for FC Luch-Energiya Vladivostok on 27 June 2007 in the Russian Cup game against FC Metallurg Krasnoyarsk. He also appeared in the next Russian Cup season on 6 August 2008 against FC Baltika Kaliningrad.

External links
 
 

1990 births
Living people
Russian footballers
Association football goalkeepers
FC Luch Vladivostok players
FC Tekstilshchik Ivanovo players